Madar Sara (also Romanized as Mādar Sarā; also known as Mādar Sarā-ye Bālā) is a village in Khara Rud Rural District, in the Central District of Siahkal County, Gilan Province, Iran. At the 2006 census, its population was 24, in 5 families.

References 

Populated places in Siahkal County